LiveLeak was a British video sharing website, headquartered in London. The site was founded on 31 October 2006, in part by the team behind the Ogrish.com shock site which closed on the same day. LiveLeak aimed to freely host real footage of politics, war, and many other world events and to encourage and foster a culture of citizen journalism.

It was shut down on 5 May 2021. The URL was changed to redirect to ItemFix, another video sharing site.

History

LiveLeak first came to prominence in 2007 following the filming and leaking of the execution of Saddam Hussein. This, among others, earned the site a mention from White House Press Secretary Tony Snow as the likely place to see updates or stories from active soldiers.

On 30 July 2007, the BBC programme Panorama broadcast a show on how street violence between children as young as 11 was being posted on websites including LiveLeak. When Panorama queried the "extremely violent videos" that were posted to LiveLeak's website, co-founder Hayden Hewitt refused to take them all down, stating: "Look, all this is happening, this is real life, and this is going on, and we're going to have to show it."

LiveLeak was again in the spotlight in March 2008, when it was hosting the anti-Quran film Fitna made by Dutch politician Geert Wilders. Fitna was taken down for 48 hours as personal threats against Hewitt, the only public representative of the site, peaked. The re-post date was 30 March 2008 after arrangements for Hewitt's family and safety had been improved. However, the video was soon removed again over a copyright claim.

On 24 March 2014, LiveLeak and Ruptly announced a content partnership.

On 19 August 2014, a video depicting the beheading of U.S. journalist James Foley was posted by Islamic State terrorists on YouTube and other sites. When it was reported on by U.S. News & World Report, YouTube and Facebook deleted all related footage and implemented bans, demand increased for LiveLeak's footage as they currently allowed this. In response to the James Foley video, Hewitt posted that LiveLeak's policy had been updated to ban all beheading footage produced by the Islamic State. The website continued to host the original video that depicted the aftermath of Foley's execution for its historical relevance as it did not depict the beheading itself.

On 30 March 2019, Australian telecom Telstra denied millions of Australians access to websites 4chan, 8chan, Voat, Zero Hedge, and LiveLeak as a response to the video of the Christchurch mosque shootings in New Zealand spreading. LiveLeak responded that they didn't carry the video and were removing uploads of it. The ISPs in question didn't respond.

At the beginning of June 2020, LiveLeak temporarily disabled users ability to log into the website, and it also only suggested videos from other sources, such as YouTube or Dailymotion. After 14 June 2020, it became possible to log into the website and view LiveLeak's hosted videos again. Those who did not want to log in to LiveLeak would only see suggested videos that were hosted by YouTube, Dailymotion and VK.

On 5 May 2021, the LiveLeak website closed, with site visitors being redirected to ItemFix.

See also
 Comparison of video hosting services

References

External links

 

2006 establishments in the United Kingdom
2021 disestablishments in the United Kingdom
Articles containing video clips
British news websites
Citizen journalism
Defunct British websites
Defunct companies based in London
Internet properties disestablished in 2021
Internet properties established in 2006